Eberhard von Sülichen (c. 856 – after 889) was a Frankish nobleman, Count of Sülichgau.

It has been reported that he was the son of Unruoch III of Friuli, the Margrave of Friuli, a son of the Frankish Unruoching Duke of Friuli Eberhard of Friuli and of Gisela, daughter of Louis the Pious. It has also been reported that his father was Adelhard von Burc, lay abbot of Cysoing, himself a son of Eberhard of Friuli.

One of his children was Judith, who married Arnulf, Duke of Bavaria, the mother of Eberhard and Judith.

He is also often referred to as the father of Regelinda of Zürich, Duchess of Swabia.

References

Counts of Germany
Dukes of Germany
People from Zürich
10th-century German people
10th-century French people
10th-century deaths
Carolingian dynasty